Kirkby Stephen Grammar School is a coeducational secondary school. It is an Academy and has a sixth form. It is located in Kirkby Stephen in the English county of Cumbria.

The school was founded in 1566 by Thomas Wharton, 1st Baron Wharton, under letters patent granted by Queen Elizabeth I. Although it has retained the grammar school in its name, Kirkby Stephen became a comprehensive school in 1959 and converted to academy status in 2011.

Kirkby Stephen Grammar School offers GCSEs and BTECs as programmes of study for pupils, while students in the sixth form have the option to study from a range of A-levels and vocational courses.

Notable former pupils
John William Cameron, brewer

See also
 List of English and Welsh endowed schools (19th century)

References

External links
Kirkby Stephen Grammar School official website

Secondary schools in Cumbria
Educational institutions established in the 1560s
1566 establishments in England
Academies in Cumbria
Kirkby Stephen